Old School RuneScape is a massively multiplayer online role-playing game (MMORPG) developed and published by Jagex. The game was released on 22 February 2013. When Old School RuneScape launched, it began as an August 2007 version of the game RuneScape, which was highly popular prior to the launch of RuneScape 3. The game has since received engine improvements, new content, and quality of life updates largely decided by in-game polls. Despite originally having a smaller development team and a slower relative update schedule, Old School RuneScape has a larger player-base than RuneScape. A mobile version for Android and iOS was released in October 2018.

Gameplay

Old School RuneScape is an MMORPG with adventure elements. It features a persistent world in which players can interact with each other and the environment. The basic mechanics are largely the same as RuneScape on 10 August 2007. The player controls a single (human) character and can interact with NPCs, objects, and entities in the game world by left-clicking, or selecting an option from the object's right-click menu, since many objects can offer more than one interaction option. Users can gain experience points (exp.) and level up individual skills, making their playable character more powerful or more capable of using that skill.

There is a large selection of skills, grouped mainly between three different categories: combat, gathering, and artisan. Combat skills aid the player in defeating enemy monsters or other players, with skills such as strength, range, and magic, among others. The gathering skills, such as mining, fishing, and woodcutting allow the player to gather in game resources. The artisan skills include skills such as cooking, crafting, and smithing. The input mechanics are mainly point-and-click. The game runs on a tick-based system where the game state refreshes every 600 milliseconds.

Post-release features
Features that were not released on RuneScape until after 2007 have since been released to Old School RuneScape such as the God Wars Dungeon and the Soul Wars minigame. Content exclusive to Old School RuneScape has been added too including new areas such as Fossil Island and Great Kourend, minigames such as The Inferno, quests such as Dragon Slayer 2 and Song of the Elves, and bosses such as the Nightmare of Ashihama. and skilling activities. Players can obtain one-off pets that follow them around the game world. Players can together defeat new powerful enemies in raids such as the Chambers of Xeric and the Theatre of Blood. Players can also join clans.

Old School RuneScape also offers an "Ironman" game mode, where players are completely barred from economic interaction with other players, and they must be self-sufficient. Ironman mode players cannot take items that other players have dropped or sold to stores, or pick up items dropped by players killed in PvP situations. First introduced in October 2014, this is often considered one of the most difficult ways to play the game, as many late-game items only come from high level bosses and have a small chance of being obtained. Although these accounts can still use all the game's chat features, the game mode is often touted as a "single-player" experience due to the necessity of solo exploration of the game world for progression. The game features several variations of the normal Ironman mode, including an "Ultimate Ironman Mode" that cannot use the in-game banks and a "Hardcore Ironman Mode" that turns into a normal Ironman account after dying for the first time.

Setting
Old School RuneScape largely takes place in the fictional realm of Gielinor, a planet filled with multiple environments and climates. It is divided into kingdoms and is inhabited by humans, vampyres, elves, monkeys, dwarves, fairies, gnomes, goblins, trolls, ogres and other races.

Gielinor's basic history is told in five Ages. Guthix, the god of balance, shaped Gielinor in the First Age. In the Second Age, Guthix went into slumber, and many other gods established power on Gielinor. The mortal Zamorak apotheosised into the god of chaos after slaying the god Zaros. This act provoked the Third Age - the Cataclysmic God Wars, in which all the gods of Gielinor waged war on each other. The God Wars ended when the Forinthry region was destroyed by the fighting, rendering it as the inhospitable Wilderness, and in turn awakening Guthix; Whom, angered by the conflict, banished all the other Gods from Gielinor. In the Fourth Age, mortal races fought and competed until human mages discovered how to create runestones. By the Fifth Age, humans became the dominant race.

Development and release

In response to the declining player base and negative update reception of the original and then-current version of RuneScape, Jagex CEO Mark Gerhard officially announced a poll for the creation of Old School RuneScape in a news article in February 2013. The article explained that an August 2007 backup of RuneScape was located in the company's backup archives. The company admitted that the game had changed a lot and that the backup could be used to create a separate version of the game if the players desired. In the article, Jagex explained the goals of the poll, and what each number bracket would unlock for the player community. In two weeks, it received enough votes for the game to be released.  The ending total vote count was 449,351, which fell short of the 500,000 mass reward tier. Jagex did however incorporate three of the five incentives of the highest tier by approving vote based polls on all content, upgraded bot protection, and no additional fees for this game mode.

Old School RuneScape was released for Windows, macOS on 22 February 2013. Upon release, the game was only playable for accounts that had a membership subscription. The option for non-members to play in the limited free-to-play areas was granted in February 2015.

Post-release

Although Old School RuneScape has a small team of developers relative to that of the live version of RuneScape, it receives regular patches and new content of that of a flagship product. Most updates and changes are polled, and can be voted on in-game. The proposed updates are voted on by players, and are only implemented if 70 percent of paying players accept them. Poll results used to be visible to everyone before casting their votes, but after April 2019, poll results became hidden until the conclusion of the polls. Suggestions made by fans on Reddit have been polled and added to the game.

A mobile port of the game was previewed at the Game Developers Conference in March 2018. It was released for Android and iOS devices was released on 30 October 2018. In under two weeks, it became the most downloaded mobile game in eight different countries, surpassing a million downloads.

In October 2020, following the release of RuneScape 3 on Steam, it was announced that Old School Runescape would arrive on the platform in 2021. Old School RuneScape released on Steam on 24 February 2021.

117Scape's HD Plugin, a mod for the third-party client RuneLite was released on 14 September 2021.

Seasonal competition

Deadman Mode
Deadman Mode is a separate incarnation of Old School RuneScape released on 29 October 2015, which features open-world player versus player combat and accelerated experience rates. If one player kills another, the victor receives a key to a chest letting them loot items from their victim's account. Players who engage other players in combat will be marked with a skull icon – "skulled" players come under attack from NPCs if they try to enter safe cities, and the number of keys they are holding will be visible to other players making them an obvious target. Players who die in Deadman Mode will lose a significant portion of their experience points in all but five skills of the player's choice.

A new season, Deadman Reborn, returned in 2021.

Leagues
At RuneFest 2019, Jagex announced a special new high-speed gamemode with similarities to Deadman Mode called "Old School Runescape Leagues". Leagues contrast with the original servers in that they, much like Deadman Mode, will exist as a separate game instance and only exist for a short amount of time. Each league is intended to run for two months. Players in this gamemode compete with others to progress faster and farther before the two month deadline is over. Players that join select game servers will start anew, have vastly increased experience rates, and have the ability to unlock special permanent perks that add further multipliers to rewards and experience.

The first iteration of Leagues was entitled the "Twisted League" and ran from 14 November 2019 until 16 January 2020. In this League, players were restricted to the regions of the Kebos Lowlands and Great Kourend. The second iteration, "Trailblazer League", began on 28 October 2020. Shortly after, the game reached an all time record of 157,000 players playing at one time.

Holiday Events
At various times during the year, Old School RuneScape launches temporary holiday events, where players can complete seasonal quests to earn special rewards. Currently, there are four annual holiday events: Easter, Halloween, Christmas and the "birthday event".

Esports

Wilderness Wars
An esports tournament "Wilderness Wars" was held at the 61st Insomnia Gaming Festival on 26 August 2017.

Deadman Tournaments
Additionally, Jagex hosts separate, recurring "Deadman Tournaments" where players can qualify for a final elimination round, incentivized by monetary prizes. The esports company ESL organized the fourth Deadman competition. The Autumn Finals of September 2018 boasted a 20,000 grand prize. For most major events, tournament coverage is done by a selection of dedicated esports organizations and personnel who provide on-site commentary, analysis, and player interviews surrounding the event in progress, similar to traditional sporting events. The primary medium for professional coverage is through the live streaming platform Twitch.tv.

Reception
Professional reviews have been generally positive. Most critics have praised the game for introducing new features while still maintaining the traditional gameplay of RuneScape. Austin Wood of PC Gamer gave Old School RuneScape a score of 77 out of 100.

Writing for PC World, John Gaudiosi called it a "nostalgic experience". Steven Messner of Rock, Paper, Shotgun wrote "there’s something lovely about a company being just as enthusiastic about where their game is headed as where it came from". In The Cambridge News, Matt Gooding wrote "since its resurrection, the game has continued to embrace, celebrate, and expand on its origins to provide a truly nostalgic PvP experience for its growing legions of players." Eli Becht of Heavy.com wrote "there’s a sense of nostalgia to OSRS that keeps people playing and it features the loved “player killing” aspect of the game that was removed for a period of time." Christopher Dring of GamesIndustry.biz wrote "it is easy to dismiss its popularity as something that simply taps into that nostalgia for old-school games, but the fact it is now four years old and still growing every year suggests that there is more to it than that."

Awards and nominations
The game was nominated for the "Heritage" and "Best Role-Playing Game" awards at The Independent Game Developers' Association Awards 2018 and 2019, and won the award for "EE Mobile Game of the Year" at the 15th British Academy Games Awards. In addition, it won the award for "Best Mobile Game" at the Develop:Star Awards, whereas its other nomination was for "Best Innovation". It was also nominated for "Game of the Year" and "Best Live Ops" at the Pocket Gamer Mobile Games Awards.

Subscriptions

Old School RuneScape, like RuneScape, has a free-to-play (F2P) mode of the game with limited in-game content, making its money through membership subscriptions from pay-to-play (P2P) players who have access to the full game. Membership can be bought from Jagex either directly or in the form of Bonds. Bonds can be redeemed by players for membership, or sold to other players for in game currency.

Old School Runescape has a larger player-base than RuneScape 3. It hit a million users in October 2013.

Community
The playerbase opposes the introduction of microtransactions.

In June 2017, the addition of an LGBT pride-themed holiday event, in which players were tasked with finding the pieces to create a rainbow scarf, caused controversy among players for being seen as political and out of place. Jagex responded, "There’s no political statement here. Our only aim is to acknowledge and honour an event that promotes empathy, acceptance and love."

The Rules of RuneScape prohibit players from engaging in the real-world sale or purchase of items, gold, or services. Despite the repercussions for gold farming, including the banning of suspected accounts, players continue to amass Old School RuneScape gold with the intention of selling it for real-life currency on third party websites. Gold farming has also become the primary source of real-world income for many Venezuelan players, due to the ongoing economic crisis in the country. This has been met with mixed reactions from the game community; some are sympathetic to their situation, while others emphasize the negative impact of gold farming on the game economy and community. Venezuelan and Spanish-speaking players have been subjected to increased prejudice within the community due to their perceived role in gold farming.

Fan-made YouTube Let's Plays of the game's Ironman mode, with additional self-imposed handicaps or challenges, are popular.

See also
 Falador Massacre

References

Further reading

External links

 

2013 video games
Android (operating system) games
Browser-based multiplayer online games
Graphical MUDs
IOS games
Jagex
Java platform games
Linux games
MacOS games
Massively multiplayer online role-playing games
Active massively multiplayer online games
Open-world video games
Video games about magic
Video games developed in the United Kingdom
Video games set on fictional planets
Virtual economies
Windows games
Video games with cross-platform play
Video games scored by Ian Taylor
BAFTA winners (video games)